Van Hintum is a surname. Notable people with the surname include:

Bart van Hintum (born 1987), Dutch footballer
Marc van Hintum (born 1967), Dutch footballer
Saskia van Hintum (born 1970), Dutch volleyball player and coach

Surnames of Dutch origin